Alessandro Ghiretti (born 18 January 2002 in Montauban) is a French racing driver and former member of the Sauber Junior Team.

Early life 
Alessandro was born in Montauban to a family from Italian origins. His father Alain Ghiretti is an entrepreneur in metal construction. In the 1980s his father was  a racing driver in Formula Renault and Formula 3000. Since August 2017 Alessandro's family resides in Marrakesh.

Career

Karting 
Ghiretti began karting at the age of seven, claiming numerous titles in his career, including the first place of the 2016 X30 Junior IAME National Final in Lavilledieu and the third place of the Challenge Europa X30 Junior B in Castelletto.

Lower formulae 
In 2017, Ghiretti stepped up to single-seaters, contesting the Italian F4 championship.

In December 2018, Ghiretti signed with the British team Dragon Hitech GP to run in the 2019 F3 Asian Championship, both the winter and main sessions.

In 2019 he contested the ADAC Formula 4 Championship and Italian F4 Championship with US Racing-CHRS. In November, he attended the post-season tests of the Formula Renault Eurocup, at Autodromo Nazionale di Monza with ART Grand Prix and at Circuit Paul Ricard with Bhaitech.  In March 2020 he took part in the pre-season test at Circuit Ricardo Tormo with MP Motorsport.

Formula One
As part of his signing with US Racing-CHRS, Ghiretti was named as part of the Sauber Junior Team's 2019 line-up.

Racing record

Career summary

† As Ghiretti was a guest driver, he was ineligible for points.
* Season still in progress.

Complete ADAC Formula 4 Championship results
(key) (Races in bold indicate pole position) (Races in italics indicate fastest lap)

References

External links
 

2002 births
Living people
People from Montauban
French racing drivers
Italian F4 Championship drivers
French F4 Championship drivers
ADAC Formula 4 drivers
Porsche Supercup drivers
US Racing drivers
Hitech Grand Prix drivers
F3 Asian Championship drivers
Charouz Racing System drivers
Team Meritus drivers
Sauber Motorsport drivers
French sportspeople of Italian descent
French expatriate sportspeople in Morocco
Le Mans Cup drivers